Europa Press is a Spanish news agency founded in 1953. It broadcasts news 24 hours a day, publishing 3,000 articles on average per day.

It serves content to almost 2,000 clients, including the main Spanish media: radios; newspapers; televisions and national, autonomic and local digital media. Also, among its clients there are the High Statal Institutions, all Public Ministries, Autonomous Governments, Public Halls, Public Deputations and the rest of Public Administrations at all levels, political parties, business organizations, labor unions and the main companies and foundations.  These informations -with both general and specialized character and served in text and audiovisual format- are one of the main information sources for mass media and press offices.

Europa Press has headquarters in every Spanish Autonomous Community and correspondents in each provincial capital. This allows the news agency to offer a very concrete informative product from local and autonomic issues, which is of key importance for institutions and companies.

Press offices hire Europa Press' services in order to be informed in real time about the general or concrete current situation of their working area. The agency also offers companies the possibility of publishing their own news in corporate webs and spread them through its intranet.

History 
In 1953, the journalist and writer Torcuato Luca de Tena Brunet founded and individual company that was called 'Agencia Europa', with the aim of creating and spreading editorial material such as books, novels and brochures with pictures about summaries of successful theatre plays or movies. The name 'Europa' responds to the European vocation of this founding group. At the beginning, the name was accompanied with 'Documents and International reports'. In 1958 it was changed to 'Agencia Europa Press', as it is still called today. This project initially associated with Florentino Pérez Embid, Andrés Rueda, Luis Valls, Gonzalo Fernández de la Mora, Javier García Vinuesa, Antonio Fontán and Ángel Benito, among others. The agency has had four head offices, always in Madrid and the actual one is at Paseo de la Castellana.

In 1963, Antonio Herrero Losada was named director, a post he held until his retirement from active journalism in 1989. That same year a big capital increase was made along with the change of the head office, leading to substantial growth over the next years. In 1966, Europa Press started its informative service, competing with agencies like Efe, Logos, Pyresa, Fiel or Mencheta. A key person entered in the agency in 1968: Francisco Martín Fernández de Heredia. His personal and professional activities avoided in 1969 the shutdown of company. At the same time, he strengthened the business project in the following years until it became the solid multimedia group that it is today.

Despite the political pressures suffered, mainly in the second part of 1960s, specially from the Information and Tourism Ministry, directed by Manuel Fraga (he wanted the agency to merge with Efe and he even asked clients to end their contracts with Europa Press), the agency made it through in part thanks to Francisco Martín, that had been named managing director shortly before this conflict. Francisco Martín (1922-2011) kept playing a fundamental role in the company's growth during the next decades until the end of the 1990s when he delegated his functions to his descendants.

In 1970, Europa Press started a new service that was called 'Economic Summary'. It was a text that gathered the most important political and economic information of the day and was later distributed by post to the clients. This way information was more easily transmitted because it saved part of the censorship that the official channels suffered at that time. During the 1970s, Europa Press achieved some of its major successes, such as giving the worldwide exclusive of the death of the dictator Francisco Franco and on the following year the designation of Adolfo Suárez as President of the Government The press coverage of the disease and death of Francisco Franco translated into the National Journalism Award in 1975.

In the 1990s, the agency started its territorial expansion and opened business delegations in the 17 Spanish Autonomous Communities, each of it with its own informative service. This way, all the Spanish territory was covered with journalists in every provincial capital and correspondents in the main Spanish cities. At the same time, informative services were opened in all the official languages in Spain: Catalan, Basque, Galician and Asturian.

In 2005, the platform 'Desayunos Informativos' was created. It was one of the first forums for debates in Spain. Presidents of the Government, ministers, presidents of Autonomous Communities, High Statal Institutions, foreign Prime Ministers have been some of the public figures that have participated in the ‘Desayunos’.

En 2012, it was published that Europa Press has closed three years in negative equity because of the loss of clients and the reduction of its sponsorships -many of them were institutional or depended on public companies--. The agency implemented a strategy based on the control of expenses and on April 11 fired 7 workers, 36 hours after of knowing that Journalist Union of Madrid has called sindical elections in three companies of the group.

Areas 

The Europa Press group is made up of several independent limited-liability companies, built around seven areas of business:

 Europa Press Noticias
Notimérica (Noticias de América Latina)
 Europa Press Televisión
 Europa Press Reportajes
 Europa Press Comunicación
 Europa Press Internet
 Europa Press Ediciones
 Europa Press.Net

Personnel 
 Antonio Herrero Losada: He was the director during years, and could show truth, freedom of speech, and courageousness to the editors. It involved penalties which was about to have his job losen. When he retired in 1989, he wrote the history of the agency, but he couldn't finish it because he died in August 1992.
 José Mario Armero Alcántara: He was president of Europa Press during decades after the end of the Francoist Spain. He was a very important figure to the Spanish transition to democracy, and served to Juan Carlos I and Adolfo Suárez. Armero Alcántar carried on writing the history of the agency which Herrero Losada started.
 Francisco Martín Fernández Heredia: He was president of Junta de Fundadores, chief executive officer and then president of Europa Press after the death of Armero Alcántara. Fernández Heredia administrated the resources of the agency. He sent a letter to Carrero Blanco so he could save the vanishing of the agency. At the beginning of 2007, Fernández Heredia planned to finish writing the history of the agency, but it was ended by Jesús Frías Alonso.

References

Bibliography

External links

News agencies based in Spain